Coen de Koning (born 5 April 1983) is a Dutch competitive sailor. He competed at the 2016 Summer Olympics in Rio de Janeiro, in the mixed Nacra 17.

References

External links

1983 births
Living people
Dutch male sailors (sport)
Olympic sailors of the Netherlands
Sailors at the 2016 Summer Olympics – Nacra 17
People from Hoorn
Sportspeople from North Holland